Xuanyuandao (軒轅道 "Way of Xuanyuan"), also known as Xuanyuanism (軒轅教) or Huangdiism (黄帝教), is a Confucian folk religion of China which was founded in Taipei, Taiwan, in 1952. The founder was Wang Hansheng (王寒生) (1899–1989), a legislator. The Church of Xuanyuan aims to restore the "national religion" of archaic (pre-Han dynasty) China, with Huangdi as the universal God.

Theology and practices
The Church of Xuanyuan subsumes all the ways of worship to local deities under one national god, Xuanyuan Huangdi (軒轅黄帝 "Xuanyuan the Yellow Deity"). According to the Shiji, Xuanyuan was the name of Huangdi, and he is traditionally considered the thearch (progenitor god) of the Han Chinese race.

Xuanyuanism is based on Confucian rationalism, and therefore rejects practices it considers superstitious that are found in other sects of Chinese folk religion, such as scripture writing through god mediumship.

Diffusion
As of 2013 the Xuanyuandao has 200,000 adherents in Taiwan and is also active in China, where it runs temples, schools, and members take part in the sacrifices celebrated at the Xuanyuan Temple, the largest temple dedicated to Huangdi in the world. Huangdi is also worshipped in Chinese folk religion by millions of people who do not necessarily belong to the Church of Xuanyuan.

See also
 Chinese salvationist religions
 Confucian church

Footnotes

References

Sources
 Christian Jochim, "Carrying Confucianism into the Modern World: The Taiwan Case". In Philip Clart, Charles Brewer Jones. Religion in Modern Taiwan: Tradition and Innovation in a Changing Society. University of Hawaii Press, 2003. ), pp. 48–83.
 Goossaert, Vincent, David Palmer. The Religious Question in Modern China. University of Chicago Press, 2011. 
 Patricia Eichenbaum Karetzky. Journal of Chinese Religions. Fall 1997, No. 25.

1952 establishments in Taiwan
Chinese salvationist religions
Religious Confucianism
Religion in Taiwan
Religious organizations established in 1952